Ramileh (also Romanized as Ramīleh and Romeyleh) is a village in Shalahi Rural District, in the Central District of Abadan County, Khuzestan Province, Iran. At the 2006 census, its population was 2,043, in 368 families.

References 

Populated places in Abadan County